The IJF World Tour tournament in Tel Aviv is an international judo competition held since 2019 at the Drive in Arena in Tel Aviv, as part of the International Judo Federation Grand Slam series. Being held as a Grand Prix for the inaugural two years, the tournament was elevated to a Grand Slam in 2021.

Venues
Drive in Arena (2019-)

Past winners

Men's

Women's

References

External links
Competition page, International Judo Federation
The Competition at JudoInside.com

Tel Aviv
Tel Aviv
 
Grand
Judo
Judo
Judo